Valente Rodriguez (born February 14, 1964) is an American actor. He is best known for his role as Ernie Cardenas on the sitcom George Lopez. He also starred as Cesar in the TV Land sitcom Happily Divorced, as well as guest starring on Yes, Dear, Mad About You, and ER, and had film roles as Chuey in Salsa, Frankie in 1993's Blood In Blood Out and as Marco in Suckers (2001).

Life and career
Rodriguez was born and raised in Edcouch, Texas, of Mexican descent. He attended the University of Texas-Pan American.

In 1988, Rodriguez moved to Los Angeles, California. He later landed his first leading role in the film Salsa. Other film credits include Impulse, Twenty Bucks, Ed, Volcano, Blood In Blood Out (Bound by Honor), Suckers, Erin Brockovich,
Roosters, The Ugly Truth, The New Guy and the critically acclaimed Mi Familia or My Family.

He has also made television appearances as a regular on the Fox's comedy show Culture Clash, as well as Mad About You, The Golden Girls, Growing Pains, Falcon Crest, Beverly Hills, 90210, Dharma and Greg, Yes, Dear, Gotta Kick It Up!, Sabrina the Teenage Witch, and he also makes quick appearances in the films The House Bunny and (500) Days of Summer.

Rodriguez is most known for his role as Ernesto "Ernie" Cardenas on George Lopez as George's best friend and his co-worker throughout the series for 6 years and appeared in 120 episodes.

He can be found on Comcast On Demand's "English For All" under the Learn English category. He plays the character Abro Cadabro, the brother of a woman with whom The Wizard is going on a date.

Filmography

Film

Television

References

External links
 

Place of birth missing (living people)
Living people
American male film actors
American male television actors
Hispanic and Latino American male actors
American male actors of Mexican descent
People from Hidalgo County, Texas
University of Texas–Pan American alumni
Male actors from Texas
20th-century American male actors
21st-century American male actors
1964 births